Cecil Irwin (December 7, 1902 – May 3, 1935) was an American jazz reed player and arranger.

Irwin played early in his career with Carroll Dickerson, Erskine Tate, and Junie Cobb before joining Earl Hines's band as a saxophonist and arranger. He worked for several years with Hines in a variety of ensembles, recording with him extensively. He also played during this time as a sideman with Johnny Dodds, Jabbo Smith, King Oliver, and Joe Venuti. In 1935 he was killed in a car crash while on tour in Des Moines, Iowa.

References
Eugene Chadbourne, [ Cecil Irwin] at Allmusic

1902 births
1935 deaths
American jazz saxophonists
American male saxophonists
20th-century American saxophonists
20th-century American male musicians
American male jazz musicians
Road incident deaths in Iowa